Chloé Zhao is a Chinese filmmaker known for her films Songs My Brothers Taught Me (2015), The Rider (2018), and Nomadland (2020).

Major awards

Academy Awards

British Academy Film Awards

Golden Globe Awards

Industry awards

ACE Eddie Awards

British Independent Film Awards

Directors Guild of America Awards

Gotham Independent Film Awards

Independent Spirit Awards

Producers Guild of America Awards

USC Scripter Awards

Film festival awards

Cannes Film Festival

Toronto International Film Festival

Venice Film Festival

Coronado Island Film Festival

Film critics awards

Alliance of Women Film Journalists

Boston Society of Film Critics Awards

Chicago Film Critics Association

Critics' Choice Awards

Dallas–Fort Worth Film Critics Association

Detroit Film Critics Society

Florida Film Critics Circle Awards

Houston Film Critics Society Awards

London Film Critics' Circle

Los Angeles Film Critics Association

National Society of Film Critics

New York Film Critics Circle Awards

New York Film Critics Online

Online Film Critics Society

San Francisco Bay Area Film Critics

Satellite Awards

Seattle Film Critics Society

Toronto Film Critics Association

Vancouver Film Critics Awards

Washington D.C. Area Film Critics Awards

References

External links

Lists of awards received by film director
Lists of awards received by writer